KEMU may refer to:

 King Edward Medical University, the oldest and one of the most prestigious medical schools in Pakistan
 Kenya Methodist University, a liberal arts university located in Meru, Kenya

Geography
 Khmu people, one of the largest ethnic groups based in northern Laos
 Khmu language, language of the Khmu people of the northern Laos region, also spoken in Vietnam